The 2021 South African Hip Hop Awards took place on 10 December 2021 and were the 10th edition of the South African Hip Hop Awards. The ceremony celebrates achievements in entertainment and music.

The nominees were announced on 2 November 2021 on official South African Hip Hop Awards social media pages. Big Zulu lead the nominations this year with a total of 10. Boity Thulo follows with 5 nominations.

Winners and nominees
The following is a list of winners and nominees. The winners are in Bold and were announced on 10 December 2021 at the ceremony.

References

External links

2021 music awards
2021 awards
South African music-related lists
South African music awards
Hip hop awards